Rubus nefrens is a rare North American species of brambles in the rose family. It has been found in scattered locations in the central United States, in Missouri, Iowa, Kentucky, and Ohio. Nowhere is it very common.

The genetics of Rubus is extremely complex, so that it is difficult to decide on which groups should be recognized as species. There are many rare species with limited ranges such as this. Further study is suggested to clarify the taxonomy.

References

External links
Photo of herbarium specimen at Missouri Botanical Garden

nefrens
Plants described in 1925
Flora of the United States